Oedancala dorsalis is an insect, found in the superfamily Lygaeoidea (seed bugs) which is one of the largest varied family of Heteroptera (a suborder) of Hemiptera. Seed bugs are a very diverse family of seed feeders found on various types of vegetation. There are four Nearctic species in this genus. O. bimaculate and O. cubana are neotropical species that barely make it into the United States.

Diet, ecology, and distribution
Oedancala dorsalis, can be found living on the seed heads of Carex and Cyperus both as nymphs (resemble adults except they usually have reduced wings and are incapable of flight) and adults. The seed heads allow easy camouflage. The life cycle of this species has not been studied in detail, but it is known to be a gradual, incomplete, metamorphosis (no pupa stage). It is a wide range, from Quebec and New England, west to the Dakotas and Colorado and south to Florida and Texas. Rare in Florida.

Description
They are moderately sized (6-6.5mm) with bright yellowish tinged with brown. Median and lateral pronotal lines, elongate raised calloused spot on either side of midline of scutellum, pale yellowish to almost white. Scutellar surface and claval commissure black. Apical corial margin sometimes infuscated near apex, lacking a dark spot midway along margun. First label segment extending posteriorly at least to anterior margin of eye. O. crassiman looks similar, but its first segment on its antenna is longer, and is found from Maryland to South America.

References

"Hemipterans as Plant Pathogens." Hemipterans as Plant Pathogens | Annual Review of Phytopathology. N.p., n.d. Web. 09 Apr. 2017.

Chordas, Stephen W. III; Robison, Henry W.; Chapman, Eric G.; Crump, Betty G.; and Kovarik, Peter W. (2005) "Fifty-four State Records of True Bugs (Hemiptera: Heteroptera) from Arkansas," Journal of the Arkansas Academy of Science: Vol. 59 , Article 7.

"Classification & Distribution." ENT 425 | General Entomology | Resource Library | Compendium [heteroptera]. N.p., n.d. Web. 23 Apr. 2017.

"Oedancala Dorsalis." Oedancala Dorsalis, Pachygronthid Seed Bug in the Family Pachygronthidae. N.p., n.d. Web. 23 Apr. 2017.

Slater, James A. The Lygaeidae of Florida (Hemiptera: Lygaeidae). - BugGuide.Net. Florida Dept. of Agriculture and Consumer Services, Division of Plant Industry, 1990. Web. 23 Apr. 2017.

"Species Oedancala Dorsalis." Species Oedancala Dorsalis - BugGuide.Net. N.p., n.d. Web. 23 Apr. 2017.

"Suborder Heteroptera - True Bugs." Suborder Heteroptera - True Bugs - BugGuide.Net. N.p., n.d. Web. 23 Apr. 2017.

The Insects of Cedar Creek. N.p., n.d. Web. 23 Apr. 2017.

Lygaeoidea